Modalità aereo is a 2019 Italian comedy film directed by Fausto Brizzi.

Cast

References

External links

2019 films
Films directed by Fausto Brizzi
Films scored by Bruno Zambrini
2010s Italian-language films
2019 comedy films
Italian comedy films
2010s Italian films